Eheke is a settlement in northern Namibia situated at the edge of the Oshana Region near Ondangwa Airport. Eheke was the administrative centre for Ondangwa Constituency, and after a split of this constituency in 2013 it is the centre of the Ondangwa Rural constituency.

It has various privately owned businesses, such as a supermarket, china shop, and many informal vendors selling traditional foods. Eheke is also the circuit cluster center for the school system in the area.  Within Eheke, there is an intermediate-level hospital (Eheke Clinic), which is linked to Oshakati Hospital.

Martin Pinehas (Brigadier General Commander of Namibia Air Force) is from Eheke, and many other soldiers.

History
In 1927 a water pond was established by cattle herders in the area. The name of the settlement, Eheke, is derived from this. The Evangelical Lutheran Church in Owambo Kavango, today ELCIN, established a church in 1954. The settlement was proclaimed in 2003.

References 

Populated places in the Oshana Region
Populated places established in 2003
2003 establishments in Namibia